

Lucky Seven is the second and sixth studio album released in North America and Japan, respectively, by the a cappella group Rockapella. As the name suggests, it is the seventh overall studio album by the group. While the Japanese version was awaiting release in the fall of 1996 on ForLife Records, the group independently released it in the United States beginning that summer to be sold at concerts and via mail order. The Japanese version, titled Lucky Seven: Memories and Dreams, has different artwork, a different track order, and three more songs than the US version. This album is also the last album with Rockapella's founding member Sean Altman before his departure from the group the following year in 1997.

This album is the only one of Rockapella's to indicate that all percussion was performed by Jeff Thacher "without the aid of electronic sampling, sequencing, or synthesis" in the disclaimer located on the CD insert.

Track listings

US Edition

Japan Edition

Personnel
Scott Leonard – high tenor
Sean Altman – tenor
Elliott Kerman – baritone
Barry Carl – bass
Jeff Thacher – vocal percussion

1996 albums
Rockapella albums